Colin George Pates (born 10 August 1961) is an English former professional footballer who made more than 400 appearances in the Football League. He played for various clubs, mainly in London, in a defensive role.

Career
Pates was born in Wimbledon, London. began his career with Chelsea, making his debut as an 18-year-old in a 7–3 victory against Orient in 1979. He remained with Chelsea through the turbulent early 1980s and as club captain led the side to promotion in 1983–84. He was surprisingly sold to Charlton Athletic in 1988 for £400,000 having made 346 appearances for the Blues. Two years later Pates joined Arsenal for £500,000 in January 1990. He was part of the Arsenal side that won the old First Division in 1991 but only played in one match which was not enough games to earn a winner's medal. He scored once during his time at Arsenal; his goal coming in the European Cup against Benfica. After struggling to break into the side he signed for Brighton & Hove Albion on loan, a move which became permanent in 1993.

After a knee injury forced his retirement from the top-level game, he moved into coaching. He was appointed player-manager of Crawley Town, leaving in 1996, and then had a brief stint playing for Romford. He gained coaching qualifications while managing Wingate & Finchley, and since 2001 has coached football at Whitgift School in South Croydon.

References

Living people
1961 births
Footballers from Carshalton
English footballers
Association football defenders
Chelsea F.C. players
Charlton Athletic F.C. players
Arsenal F.C. players
Brighton & Hove Albion F.C. players
Crawley Town F.C. players
Romford F.C. players
English Football League players
Premier League players
English football managers
Crawley Town F.C. managers
Wingate & Finchley F.C. managers
Association football coaches